William A. "Bill" Heidt (born 1961) is an American diplomat who was the United States Ambassador to Cambodia from 2015 to 2018. He was nominated on April 7, 2015, by President Barack Obama to succeed William E. Todd. He was confirmed by the U.S. Senate on August 5, 2015, and sworn in on September 14, 2015. His term ended on November 28, 2018.

Heidt earned a bachelor's degree in Foreign Service and International Politics from Pennsylvania State University and a master's degree in International Relations from George Washington University.

References

 

1961 births
Living people
Ambassadors of the United States to Cambodia
Elliott School of International Affairs alumni
People from Erie, Pennsylvania
Pennsylvania State University alumni